Uniting People First is a minor political party in South Africa.

The party aims to represent traditional healers and the LGBTI community.

Uniting People First has contested a number of by-elections since its formation, but has failed to win representation.

The party contested the 2019 South African general election at provincial level in North West only, failing to win any seats.

Provincial elections 

! rowspan=2 | Election
! colspan=2 | Eastern Cape
! colspan=2 | Free State
! colspan=2 | Gauteng
! colspan=2 | Kwazulu-Natal
! colspan=2 | Limpopo
! colspan=2 | Mpumalanga
! colspan=2 | North-West
! colspan=2 | Northern Cape
! colspan=2 | Western Cape
|-
! % !! Seats
! % !! Seats
! % !! Seats
! % !! Seats
! % !! Seats
! % !! Seats
! % !! Seats
! % !! Seats
! % !! Seats
|-
! 2019
| - || -
| - || -
| - || -
| - || -
| - || -
| - || -
| 0.03% || 0/33
| - || -
| - || -
|}

References

Political parties in South Africa